Netball at the 2011 All-Africa Games in Maputo, Mozambique was held between 6–15 September 2011.

Medal summary

Medal table

Results

Standings

Fixtures

References

External links
Results

Netball at the African Games
All-Africa Games
International sports competitions hosted by Mozambique
Netball competitions in Mozambique
2011 All-Africa Games